In the context of the nature-nurture debate, interactionism is the view that all human behavioral traits develop from the interaction of both "nature" and "nurture", that is, from both genetic and environmental factors. This view further holds that genetic and environmental influences on organismal development are so closely interdependent that they are inseparable from one another. Historically, it has often been confused with the statistical concept of gene-environment interaction. Historically, interactionism has presented a limited view of the manner in which behavioral traits develop, and has simply demonstrated that "nature" and "nurture" are both necessary. Among the first biologists to propose an interactionist theory of development was Daniel Lehrman. Since then, numerous interactionist perspectives have been proposed, and the contradictions between many of these perspectives has led to much controversy in evolutionary psychology and behavioral genetics. Proponents of various forms of interactionist perspectives include Philip Kitcher, who refers to his view as "causal democracy", and Susan Oyama, who describes her perspective as "constructive interactionism". Critics of interactionism include major figures in behavioral genetics such as Arthur Jensen, Robert Plomin, and philosopher Neven Sesardic.

Interactionist perspective to depression 

Depression is not dependent entirely on genetic nor environmental influences alone to trigger its onset. Both genetic and environmental factors work accompanied to transform a vulnerability to depression to be expressed in its actuality. Research has demonstrated the synchrony of polygenic scores of major depressive disorders (MDD) with stressful life events and social support to increase the probability of developing depression. Although Monroe and Simons criticize interactionism for a lack of precise measurement to grasp its ‘conceptual essence’, there’s been numerous studies surrounding gene by environment interaction commonly focussing on candidate genes such as genetic variation within the serotonin transporter (SLC6A4) gene.  As MDD is a polygenic trait its development is dependent on variations of a range of genes each exhibiting small effect sizes. Peyrot et al also found increased polygenic risk scores and genetic vulnerability in the presence of childhood trauma demonstrating the collaboration between environmental and genetic stressors. 

In the instance of personal life events however, whether they were passive or active trauma has a mediating effect on the heritability of the disorder. When passive, meaning the individual played less of an active in their trauma i.e., illness or accident, the heritability wasn’t as severe than when active i.e., in cases of separation, relationship conflict, financial or legal trouble. Contrarily, Mullins found whilst polygenic risk scores and stressful events were predictors of depression, however he believed them to be isolated factors acting independently. Whilst results in the field are unreliable, research generally points in favour of the compatibility between genetic and environmental contributors to psychopathology and depression.

Interactionist perspective to PTSD 

Ecological, biological, and residual stress pathways interact in order to manifest post-traumatic stress disorder (PTSD), the experience of trauma being the primary contributor to PTSD. The severity of trauma is a prime factor to the onset of PTSD but the question as to why only a fraction of individuals who experience trauma develop a pathological response whilst others do not rest in the assumptions that it is the combination of both genetic vulnerability that exhibit PTSD in alliance with environmental trauma. Among those who experience extreme severities of PTSD such as violent crimes, assault, severe accidents, approximately 3-35% develop symptoms. As inherent vulnerability increases the threshold for the environmental trauma to trigger the disorder decreases.

Residual stress is a key factor in the expression of PTSD, it is the initial and prolonged effects of trauma and a catalyst in its development. Ecological and biological pathways are also preceding factors that increase the likelihood of PTSD following trauma and residual stress. Ecological pathways include both personal and environmental influences such as coping mechanisms, interpersonal support, and the individual’s environment. And biological pathways include neurological anomalies, inherited traits, and structural anomalies such as hippocampal atrophy. Ecological and biological factors provide a predisposition whilst residual stress triggers its onset.

Greater trauma leads to greater levels of residual stress, and trauma can be divided into pre-trauma i.e., childhood abuse, and post-trauma i.e., social support, in which females are more influenced by post-trauma than their male counterparts in the development of PTSD. For example, survivors of sexual abuse found PTSD was influenced considerably by familial nature of support, negative parental reactions were found to intensify PTSD whereas high levels of social support helped diminish psychological fallout and recovery time.
Ecological pathways include factors such as a history of abuse, physical and sexual. Women with a history of physical abuse were found to be 5x more likely to have a history of PTSD, 10x more susceptible to experiencing it then controls. Parental abuse is a predictor for future anti-social behaviour and decreased social skills, and maladaptive social information processing increasing sensitivity to PTSD. These environmental factors aside from residual stress generate maladaptive cognitive patterns that provide a ‘breaking point’ to individuals with genetic vulnerability to PTSD to exhibit the disorder.

Biological pathways include a diversity of factors including hormonal and neurotransmitter abnormalities, and alterations in neural structure. Male adults of PTSD were found to have higher urinary biproduct of norepinephrine and epinephrine (adrenaline), lower cortisol levels, and abnormalities in neurotransmitter levels associated with anger, hostility and depression related to PTSD. Increased norepinephrine is involved with the activation of traumatic memories, and increased catecholamines are what lead to increased levels of stress-related hormones such as cortisol, and neurotransmitters associated with PTSD, which in the instance of trauma increases one’s vulnerability to it. Furthermore, structural alterations increase the susceptibility of PTSD, for example, sexually abused adolescent girls and those generally maltreated in comparison to a control group had dysregulation within their hypothalamic pituitary adrenal axis (HPA) alongside decreased hippocampal volume. Furthermore, corticotropin releasing hormone (CRH) increases heart rate and enhances fear conditioning and is also the hormone responsible for regulating the HPA axis which corresponds with symptoms of PTSD.

See also 

 Flynn effect
 Heritability
 Diathesis-stress model
 Social information processing

References

Human behavior
Behavioural genetics